was a multi-purpose stadium in Kasumigaoka, Shinjuku, Tokyo, Japan. The stadium served as the main stadium for the opening and closing ceremonies, as well as being the venue for track and field events at the 1964 Summer Olympics. The Japan national football team's home matches and major football club cup finals were held at the stadium. The stadium's official capacity was 57,363, but the seating capacity was only 48,000 seats.

Demolition was completed in May 2015, and the site was redeveloped with a new larger-capacity Olympic Stadium. The new stadium was the main venue for the 2020 Summer Olympics and Paralympics.

The original plans for the new stadium were scrapped in July 2015 by Japanese prime minister Shinzo Abe, who announced a rebid after a public outcry because of increased building costs. As a result, the new design was not ready for the 2019 Rugby World Cup, as originally intended. A new design created by architect Kengo Kuma was chosen in December 2015 to replace the original design and was completed in November 2019.

History
The stadium was completed in 1958 as the Japanese National Stadium on the site of the former Meiji Shrine Outer Park Stadium. Its first major event was the 1958 Asian Games.

The venue was unscathed by the 2011 Tōhoku earthquake and tsunami. Yasuhiro Nakamori, international relations director for the Japanese Olympic Committee, told Around the Rings he attributed the lack of damage to Japan's stringent building codes.

The National Stadium has also held a number of music concerts in the past: The Three Tenors (Luciano Pavarotti, Plácido Domingo, and Jose Carreras) in 1996, SMAP in 2005, Dreams Come True in 2007, Arashi (15 concerts between 2008 and 2013), L'Arc-en-Ciel in 2012, Momoiro Clover Z in 2014, AKB48 in 2014, and finally, the Joint concert "Sayonara National Stadium Final Week Japan Night" on 28 & 29 May 2014, which served as final goodbye to the stadium before being demolished, with artists such as Ikimono-gakari, Gospellers,  Sukima Switch, Naoto Inti Raymi, Funky Kato, Sekai no Owari, Perfume, Man with a Mission, L'Arc-en-Ciel, among others.

Notable events 
 1958: Asian Games
 1964: Summer Olympics
 1967: Summer Universiade
 1967–2013: Emperor's Cup final
 1976–1979: Japan Bowl
 1979: FIFA World Youth Championship
 1981–2001: Intercontinental Cup 
 1991: World Championships in Athletics
 1993: J.League Opening Match (Verdy Kawasaki vs Yokohama Marinos)
 1993: FIFA U-17 World Championship
 1996: The Three Tenors Concert
 2002: PRIDE Shockwave 2002
 2003: Japan Top League Opening Match
 2005–2008: FIFA Club World Cup 
 2009: AFC Champions League Final 
 2010: AFC Champions League Final

Transportation
Access to the stadium was from Sendagaya or Shinanomachi stations along the JR Chūō-Sōbu Line; from Kokuritsu Kyogijo Station on the Toei Oedo Line; and from Gaienmae Station on the Tokyo Metro Ginza Line.

References

External links

Satellite photo of the stadium from Google Maps
Stadiums in Japan:Tokyo National Stadium
National Stadium
National Stadium, Tokyo

Tokyo
Sports venues in Tokyo
Stadiums of the Asian Games
Japan
Athletics (track and field) venues in Japan
Rugby union stadiums in Japan
Rugby in Kantō
Sports venues completed in 1958
Venues of the 1964 Summer Olympics
Olympic athletics venues
Olympic equestrian venues
Olympic football venues
Venues of the 1958 Asian Games
Asian Games athletics venues
Asian Games football venues
Buildings and structures in Shinjuku
American football venues in Japan
Sports venues demolished in 2015
Defunct football venues in Japan
Demolished buildings and structures in Japan
Defunct sports venues in Japan
1958 establishments in Japan
2015 disestablishments in Japan